K-ballet is a Japanese ballet company. The company started in 1999 and has since held approximately 50 annual performances. K-Ballet's activity was first recognised internationally in July 2004, when the ballet group was invited to New York's Metropolitan Opera House with The Royal Ballet, one of the World's leading ballet companies. The honorary president is currently renowned ballet dancer, Sir Anthony Dowell.

Company members 
There are currently almost 70 dancers and artists involved in K-Ballet's productions. The most notable include Artistic Director Tetsuya Kumakawa, Principal Dancer Shohei Horiuchi,and Principal Soloist Dancer Mina Kobayashi (as of June 2022).

Principals

Principal soloists

First soloists

Soloists

References

External links 
  K-Ballet, official website

Ballet companies in Japan
Performing groups established in 1999
1999 establishments in Japan